2014
2022     
The 2014 Nepal Premier League was the first season of the Nepal Premier League. The event was organised by the Cricket Association of Nepal and managed by Zohra Sports Management. It was organised between May and June 2014 and consisted of a One Day tournament played in round-robin format followed by semi-finals and finals between the top four teams. Initially, the 2014 NPL was also supposed to include Twenty20 & Two Day tournaments but were later called off. Two-day tournament was called off by the organising committee due to bad weather conditions in the allocated venues amongst other reasons. Due to tight international schedule, ZSM was unable to complete the Twenty20 event, while telecommunication giants Ncell had also pulled out their sponsorship from the tournament. The Twenty20 & Two Day tournaments are expected to be included from the 2015 season onwards.

The One Day tournament of the 2014 season ran between 14 and 24 May. The venues for One Day tournament were  Kailali and Kanchanpur.

Panchakanya Tej were the winners of the One Day tournament after defeating Jagdamba Giants in the final held at Fapla Cricket Ground, Dhangadi, Kailali.

Launch 
The  League was unveiled on 24 February in a press conference held in Hotel Radisson, Kathmandu. Zohra Sports Management and Cricket Association of Nepal have done an exclusive agreement to run the league for an initial three years.

Teams and standings

One Day tournament

Squads

Sponsors
Ncell Nepal are the main sponsors of the NPL 2014 along with Zohra Sports Management.

Rules and regulations 
 Each team will consist of 16 players
 Maximum of 2 overseas players
 Each team must contain domestic associate player (i.e., Under-19 cricketers, regional cricketers)

Prize money

One Day tournament
 Champions: रु 2 lakhs
 Runners-up: रु 1 lakh

Fixtures and results
The inaugural match of the One Day tournament was played on 14 May 2014 at the Fapla Cricket Ground, Dhangadi, Kailali between Vishal Warriors and Sagarmatha Legends.

League stage (One Day)

Knockout stage (One Day)

Semifinal (One Day)

Final (One Day)

Statistics

One Day tournament

Most runs

Most wickets

Match fees
 Captain
 रु 5,000 per match 
 Capped players
 रु 2,500 per match 
 Uncapped players
 रु 1,000 per match

See also
 Nepal Premier League
 Cricket in Nepal
 Nepal national cricket team
 Cricket Association of Nepal

References

External links 
 Cricbuzz Nepal
 Cricketlok
 Republica
 

Nepal Premier League
2014 in Nepalese cricket